TVNZ Kidzone was a 24-hour New Zealand children's channel service run by state broadcaster Television New Zealand. The channel ran on Digital 106, channel 46 on Sky and channel 14 on Igloo.

History
Kidzone was originally a 12-hour service running on former TVNZ channel TVNZ 6. It then ran on TVNZ 7 for a year before its closure in 2012. TVNZ launched TVNZ Kidzone as TVNZ Kidzone24 on 1 May 2011.

TVNZ closed the channel on 30 April 2016, due to SKY's contract with TVNZ expiring at the end of that month. It was made available via TVNZ OnDemand on May 1, 2016.

References

TVNZ
Defunct television channels in New Zealand
Television channels in New Zealand
English-language television stations in New Zealand
Television channels and stations established in 2011
Television channels and stations disestablished in 2016